Gymnosoma persicum is a Palaearctic species of fly in the family Tachinidae.

Distribution
Central Asia, Iran.

References

Phasiinae
Diptera of Asia
Insects described in 1952